The Asia/Oceania Zone is one of the three zones of regional Davis Cup competition in 2011.

In the Asia/Oceania Zone there are four different groups in which teams compete against each other to advance to the next group.

Bangladesh and Kyrgyzstan were promoted.

Participating teams

Format
The eight teams were split in two groups and played in a round-robin format. The group winners played the runners-up from the other group, and the winning teams were promoted to the Asia/Oceania Zone Group III in 2012.

It was played on 13–16 April 2011 at the National Tennis Complex in Dhaka, Bangladesh.

Group stage

Group A

Jordan vs. Qatar

Bahrain vs. Kyrgyzstan

Jordan vs. Kyrgyzstan

Bahrain vs. Qatar

Jordan vs. Bahrain

Qatar vs. Kyrgyzstan

Group B

Bangladesh vs. Turkmenistan

Singapore vs. Iraq

Bangladesh vs. Iraq

Singapore vs. Turkmenistan

Turkmenistan vs. Iraq

Bangladesh vs. Singapore

Playoffs

5th to 8th playoffs

Singapore vs. Bahrain

Turkmenistan vs. Qatar

Promotion playoffs

Bangladesh vs. Jordan

Kyrgyzstan vs. Iraq

References

External links
Davis Cup draw details

Asia Oceania Zone Group IV
Davis Cup Asia/Oceania Zone